Joseph Maurice Schepner (August 10, 1895 – September 28, 1959), nicknamed "Gentleman Joe", was a professional baseball player.  He was a third baseman for one season (1919) with the St. Louis Browns.  For his career, he compiled a .208 batting average in 48 at-bats, with six runs batted in. Schepner also managed several baseball teams, including the 1929 and 1932 Knoxville Smokies that later became Tennessee Smokies.

He was born in Aliquippa, Pennsylvania and died in Mobile, Alabama at the age of 63.

References

External links

1895 births
1959 deaths
St. Louis Browns players
Major League Baseball third basemen
Baseball players from Pennsylvania
Albany Senators players
Reading Pretzels players
Rochester Hustlers players
New Orleans Pelicans (baseball) players
Mobile Bears players
Louisville Colonels (minor league) players
Birmingham Barons players
Albany Nuts players
Gadsden Eagles players
Knoxville Smokies players
Greenville Spinners players
Vicksburg Hill Billies players
Jackson Mississippians players
People from Aliquippa, Pennsylvania